Binagol is a Filipino sweet steamed delicacy of the Waray people made from mashed giant taro corms, condensed milk, sugar, coconut milk, and egg yolks. It is distinctively placed in half of a coconut shell and then wrapped in banana leaves and twine. The name means "to place in a coconut shell", from the Visayan bagol, "coconut shell". Binagol traditionally uses the corms of the giant taro (locally known as talyan or talian); however, the corms of taro (known in Tagalog as gabi and in the Eastern Visayas, where the delicacy originates, as gaway) is also alternatively used. It is a type of nilupak.

See also
 Kalamay
 Moron (food)
 Ube halaya

References

Foods containing coconut
Philippine desserts